BizPaL is a web service for Canadian businesses provided by the federal, and participating provincial/territorial, and municipal governments in Canada.

Based on information provided by the user, it generates a customized list of the necessary permits and licenses from the municipal, provincial/territorial and federal levels of government.

BizPaL is currently active in ten provinces and two territories.

Overview 
BizPaL is an online service providing information about permit and licensing requirements from the three levels of government in Canada. It is an integrated response by all levels of government to the problems entrepreneurs sometimes encounter when starting up or growing a business.

BizPaL generates a personalized list of the business documents needed from the three levels of government- local, provincial/territorial, and federal- that a new entrepreneur or small business owner may have to deal with in order to start up or grow a business. If the business is already operating, entrepreneurs can use BizPaL to verify that all the correct permits and licences have been obtained.

BizPaL was launched as a pilot project with a lead group of participating governments in December 2005 through the first half of 2006.  The BizPaL service is currently available in more than 1,000 jurisdictions across Canada.

The program is available in provinces, territories, and municipalities which have entered into an agreement between themselves and the federal government.

While the service is an initiative of the federal government, each jurisdiction is responsible for maintaining their own data within the system.

Participating governments 
As of January 1, 2018, the Territory of Nunavut is not participating in BizPaL.

The following is a list of participating provinces/territories and municipalities as listed on the BizPaL federal website.

Federal
Government of Canada
Industry Canada  
Natural Resources Canada

Alberta
Government of Alberta

Airdrie
Amisk
Arrowwood
Banff
Barrhead
Barrhead No. 11, County of
Beaumont
Beaver County
Bittern Lake
Black Diamond
Bonnyville
Brazeau County
Brooks
Calgary
Camrose
Camrose County
Canmore
Carmangay
Caroline
Carstairs
Castor
Champion
Clyde
Cochrane
Cold Lake
Coronation
Cremona
Crossfield
Czar
Devon
Dewberry
Didsbury
Drayton Valley
Edmonton
Elnora
Flagstaff County
Foothills No. 31, Municipal District of
Fort Saskatchewan
Grande Cache
Grande Prairie
Halkirk
Hanna
High Level
High River
Hinton
Hughenden
Lac La Biche County
Lac Ste. Anne County
Lacombe
Leduc
Lesser Slave River No. 124, Municipal District of
Lethbridge
Lloydminster
Lomond
Marwayne
Medicine Hat
Milo
Newell, County of
Northern Lights, County of
Northern Sunrise County
Okotoks
Olds
Paintearth No. 18, County of
Parkland County
Peace River
Penhold
Ponoka
Provost
Provost No. 52, Municipal District of
Red Deer
Redwater
Rocky Mountain House
Rocky View County
Slave Lake
Smoky Lake County
Spirit River No. 133, Municipal District of
Spruce Grove
St. Albert
St. Paul No. 19, County of
Stony Plain
Strathcona County
Sundre
Swan Hills
Thorhild County
Two Hills
Two Hills No. 21, County of
Vermilion
Vermilion River, County of
Vulcan
Vulcan County
Wainwright
Westlock
Westlock County
Wetaskiwin
Wheatland County
Whitecourt
Wood Buffalo
Woodlands County

British Columbia
Government of British Columbia

100 Mile House
Abbotsford
Armstrong
Barriere
Burnaby
Cache Creek
Campbell River
Castlegar
Central Okanagan Regional District
Central Saanich
Chetwynd
Chilliwack
Coldstream
Colwood
Coquitlam
Creston
Dawson Creek
Delta
Elkford
Enderby
Esquimalt
Fort St. James
Fort St. John
Fraser Lake
Fruitvale
Gibsons
Golden
Grand Forks
Hazelton
Hope
Hudson's Hope
Kamloops
Kaslo
Kelowna
Keremeos
Kitimat
Ladysmith
Lake Country
Lake Cowichan
Langford
Langley
Langley, Township of
Lillooet
Logan Lake
Lumby
Mackenzie
Maple Ridge
Merritt
Mission
Nanaimo
Nelson
New Hazelton
New Westminster
North Cowichan
North Saanich
North Vancouver
North Vancouver, District of
Northern Rockies Regional Municipality
Oliver
Osoyoos
Parksville
Peachland
Penticton
Pitt Meadows
Port Alberni
Port Coquitlam
Port Hardy
Port McNeill
Port Moody
Powell River
Prince George
Prince Rupert
Princeton
Qualicum Beach
Queen Charlotte
Quesnel
Radium Hot Springs
Revelstoke
Richmond
Rossland
Saanich
Salmon Arm
Sayward
Sechelt
Sicamous
Sidney
Smithers
Sooke
Spallumcheen
Sparwood
Squamish
Summerland
Sunshine Coast Regional District
Surrey
Terrace
Tofino
Trail
Tumbler Ridge
Ucluelet
Valemount
Vancouver
Vanderhoof
Vernon
Victoria
View Royal
West Kelowna, District of
West Vancouver
Whistler
White Rock
Williams Lake

Manitoba
Government of Manitoba

Alexander, Rural Municipality of
Arborg
Brandon
Carman
Cartwright
Coldwell
Dauphin
Dauphin, Rural Municipality of
De Salaberry
Deloraine
Dufferin
Ellice
Eriksdale
Ethelbert
Ethelbert, Rural Municipality of
Flin Flon
Franklin
Gilbert Plains
Gilbert Plains, Rural Municipality of
Gillam
Gimli, Rural Municipality of
Glenwood, Rural Municipality of
Grandview
Grandview, Rural Municipality of
Hillsburg, Rural Municipality of
Langford
Lorne
Manitou
Minnedosa
Minto, Rural Municipality of
Montcalm
Morden
Morris
Morris, Rural Municipality of
Neepawa
Notre-Dame-de-Lourdes
Odanah
Pembina
Pinawa, Rural Municipality of
Portage la Prairie
Portage la Prairie, Rural Municipality of
Powerview-Pine Falls
Reynolds
Ritchot
Roblin
Roblin, Rural Municipality of
Rosedale
Saskatchewan, Rural Municipality of
Selkirk
Shell River, Rural Municipality of
Siglunes
Silver Creek, Rural Municipality of
Somerset
Souris
South Norfolk
St-Lazare
St-Pierre-Jolys
St. Andrews, Rural Municipality of
St. Clements, Rural Municipality of
St. Laurent, Rural Municipality of
Stanley, Rural Municipality of
Steinbach
Teulon
Thompson
Thompson, Rural Municipality of
Treherne
Victoria, Rural Municipality of
Whitemouth
Winchester
Winkler
Winnipeg
Woodlands, Rural Municipality of

New Brunswick
Government of New Brunswick

Bathurst
Blacks Harbour
Bouctouche
Campbellton
Caraquet
Dalhousie
Dieppe
Edmundston
Florenceville-Bristol
Fredericton
Grand Bay-Westfield
Grand Falls
Hampton
Hartland
Miramichi
Moncton
Neguac
Oromocto
Perth-Andover
Quispamsis
Rexton
Richibucto
Riverview
Rothesay
Sackville
Saint Andrews
Saint John
Sussex
Tracadie-Sheila

Newfoundland and Labrador
Government of Newfoundland and Labrador

Badger
Bay Bulls
Bay Roberts
Bonavista
Buchans
Burin
Centreville-Wareham-Trinity
Channel-Port aux Basques
Clarenville
Conception Bay South
Cormack
Corner Brook
Deer Lake
Ferryland
Flatrock
Gambo
Gander
Garnish
Glovertown
Grand Bank
Grand Falls-Windsor
Happy Valley-Goose Bay
Holyrood
Humber Arm South
Kippens
Labrador City
Lewisporte
Marystown
Massey Drive
Mount Pearl
Musgrave Harbour
Musgravetown
Paradise
Pasadena
Placentia
Port Blandford
Port Saunders
Portugal Cove-St. Philip's
Rocky Harbour
St. Alban's
St. Anthony
St. John's
Steady Brook
Stephenville
Summerford
Torbay
Wabana
Whitbourne
Witless Bay

Northwest Territories
Government of the Northwest Territories

Colville Lake
Dettah
Fort Resolution
Fort Simpson
Fort Smith
Gamèti
Hay River
Jean Marie River
Kakisa
Lutselk'e
Nahanni Butte
Trout Lake
Tsiigehtchic
Wekweeti

Nova Scotia
Government of Nova Scotia

Amherst
Annapolis County
Annapolis Royal
Antigonish
Antigonish County
Barrington, Municipality of the District of
Bridgetown
Cape Breton Regional Municipality
Clare
Colchester County
Cumberland County
Digby, Municipality of the District of
East Hants
Guysborough
Halifax Regional Municipality
Kentville
Kings County
Lunenburg
Lunenburg, Municipality of the District of
Middleton
New Glasgow
Pictou County
Queens County
Richmond County
Shelburne, Municipality of the District of
Stellarton
Trenton
Truro
Westville
Windsor
Wolfville
Yarmouth
Yarmouth, Municipality of the District of

Ontario
Government of Ontario

Ajax
Aurora
Aylmer
Bayham
Black River-Matheson
Blind River
Bonfield
Bracebridge
Bradford West Gwillimbury
Brampton
Brantford
Brockville
Bruce Mine
Burlington
Calvin
Cambridge
Carlow/Mayo
Central Elgin
Champlain
Chatham-Kent
Clarington
Cobourg
Cochrane
Collingwood
Conmee (Township)
Deseronto
Dryden
Dutton/Dunwich
East Gwillimbury
Edwardsburgh/Cardinal
Enniskillen
Essa
Faraday
Fort Frances
Frontenac Islands
Georgian Bluffs, Township of
Georgina
Gillies, Township of
Gravenhurst
Grimsby
Guelph
Haldimand County
Halton Region
Halton Hills
Hamilton
Hanover
Hastings Highlands Township
Hearst
Hilton
Hilton Beach
Hornepayne
Huntsville
Huron Shores
Innisfil
Jocelyn
Johnson
Kapuskasing
Kawartha Lakes
Kenora
King Township
Kingston
Kitchener
Lake of Bays
Lake of the Woods Township
Lakeshore
London
Lucan Biddulph
Malahide
Markham
Marmora and Lake
Mattawa
McKellar Township
Midland
Milton
Mississauga
Moosonee
Muskoka, District Municipality of
Muskoka Lakes, Township of
Neebing
New Tecumseth
Newmarket
Niagara, Regional Municipality of
Niagara-on-the-Lake
Norfolk
North Frontenac
North Grenville
North Shore
Oakville
Oil Springs
Oliver Paipoonge
Orillia
Oshawa
Ottawa
Owen Sound
Peel Region
Penetanguishene
Petrolia
Pickering
Plummer Additional
Red Rock
Richmond Hill
Rideau Lakes
Sault Ste. Marie
Schreiber
Smooth Rock Falls
South Algonquin
Southwold
St. Catharines
Stirling-Rawdon
Stratford
Sudbury (Greater)
Tay Township
Thunder Bay
Timmins
Toronto
Tudor and Cashel
Uxbridge
Vaughan
Waterloo
Waterloo, Regional Municipality of
Wawa
Welland
Wellesley, Township of
West Elgin
West Grey
Whitby
Whitchurch-Stouffville
White River
Windsor
Wollaston

Prince Edward Island
Government of Prince Edward Island

Afton
Alberton
Alexandra
Annandale
Bedeque
Belfast
Bideford
Bonshaw
Borden-Carleton
Breadalbane
Cardigan
Central Bedeque
Central Kings
Charlottetown
Clyde River
Cornwall
Crapaud
Darlington
Eastern Kings
Ellerslie
Georgetown
Grand Tracadie
Greenmount-Montrose
Howe Bay
Hunter River
Kensington
Lady Slipper
Little Pond
Lot 11 and area
Malpeque Bay
Meadowbank
Miltonvale Park
Miminegash
Miscouche
Montague
Morell
Montague
Murray Harbour
New Haven
Northport
Riverdale
Souris
Souris West
St. Felix
St. Louis
St. Nicholas
St. Peters Bay
Stratford
Victoria
Warren Grove
Wellington
West River
Winsloe South

Saskatchewan
Government of Saskatchewan

Arcola
Asquith
Assiniboia
Balcarres
Battleford
Bienfait
Big River
Biggar
Broadview
Bruno
Canora
Carlyle
Carnduff
Carrot River
Churchbridge
Corman Park No. 344, Rural Municipality of
Coronach
Cudworth
Cupar
Cut Knife
Dalmeny
Davidson
Delisle
Duck Lake
Dundurn
Edenwold No. 158, Rural Municipality of
Esterhazy
Estevan
Estevan No. 5, Rural Municipality of
Eston
Fort Qu'Appelle
Gravelbourg
Grenfell
Gull Lake
Hague
Herbert
Hudson Bay
Humboldt
Indian Head
Kamsack
Kelvington
Kerrobert
Kindersley
Kinistino
Kipling
Lampman
Langenburg
Langham
Lanigan
Lashburn
Leader
Lloydminster
Lumsden
Luseland
Macklin
Maidstone
Maple Creek
Martensville
Meadow Lake
Melfort
Melville
Moose Jaw
Moosomin
Nipawin
North Battleford
Northern Administration District
Osler
Outlook
Oxbow
Pilot Butte
Porcupine Plain
Preeceville
Prince Albert
Radville
Redvers
Regina
Regina Beach
Rosetown
Rosthern
Saskatoon
Shaunavon
Shellbrook
Southey
Spiritwood
Stoughton
Strasbourg
Sturgis
Swift Current
Tisdale
Unity
Wakaw
Waldheim
Warman
Watrous
Weyburn
White City
Whitewood
Wilkie
Wolseley
Wynyard
Yorkton

Yukon
Government of Yukon

Carmacks
Dawson City
Faro
Haines Junction
Mayo
Teslin
Watson Lake
Whitehorse

References 
 
 BizPaL - official website
 BizPaL Initiative on Industry Canada Website
 Canada Business Website, BizPaL search engine
 Ducatel, S. (2008-05-21) Website Geared Towards Facilitating Businesses Launched, Vulcan Advocate

Innovation, Science and Economic Development Canada
2005 establishments in Canada